Sarir or Serir was a medieval Christian state lasting from the 6th or 7th century to the 12th century in the mountainous regions of modern-day Dagestan. Its name is derived from the Arabic word for "throne" and refers to a golden throne that was viewed as a symbol of royal authority.

Origin 
Sarir was first documented as a political entity in the 6th century AD. The memory of its foundation was transmitted orally among the Caucasian Avars. According to one legend, the kingdom was established by a Persian general who was sent to control the Caucasus by a Sassanian king. This legend is corroborated by the names of local kings, which are normally of Persian or even Syrian etymology.

Sarir bordered the Khazars to the north, the Durdzuks to the west and northwest, the Georgians and Derbent to the south. As the state was Christian, Arab historians erroneously viewed it as a dependency of the Byzantine Empire. The capital of Sarir was the city of Humraj, tentatively identified with the modern-day village Khunzakh. The king resided in a remote fortress at the top of a mountain.

History 
 
During the Arab–Khazar wars of the 7th and 8th centuries, the kings of Sarir allied themselves with the Khazars. Following the victorious campaign of Merwan ibn Muhammad in 737–739, Sarir was pressed into submitting to the Caliph's authority.  It paid tribute and provided men for the Arab garrison of Derbent until the ninth century, when, emboldened by the shift in momentum in the south, Sarir asserted sovereignty over large portions of the Caucasus, including Gumik, Filan and parts of Arran. 

As the hegemony of the Caliphate crumbled, Sarir found itself continually at war with its successor states, such as Derbent and Shirvan. In these wars it was generally victorious and this allowed Sarir to manipulate the politics of Derbent. Concomitantly, the kings of Sarir shifted away from the Khazar alliance and mounted several incursions into the Khazarian steppes. The pattern of intermarriage between the royal houses of Sarir and Alania cemented the anti-Khazar alliance of the two Christian states.

Disintegration 
Alarmed by the growing Christian supremacy in the Caucasus, the Muslim powers of the region pledged mutual assistance against Sarir. Their economic and military pressure, coupled with internal discord, led to the state's disintegration in the early 12th century. After another century of Muslim ascendancy, Islam emerged as the dominant religion in the region. In the 13th century, the Caucasian Avars formed a new Muslim state, traditionally known as Avaristan.

Rulers 

 Abukhisro – (740)
 Avaz – (second half of the 9th century)
 Buht Isho I – (905)
 Philan Shah – (940–950)
 Buht Isho II – (1025–26)
 Firudzha –
 Tokku – (1065)

References 
 Minorsky V.F. History of Shirvan and Derbent. Moscow, 1963 (Минорский В.Ф. История Ширвана и Дербента. М., 1963, In Russian)
 Ataev D.M. Mountainous Dagestan during early Middle Ages (materials of archaeological excavations in Avaria). Makhachkala, 1963 (Атаев Д.М. Нагорный Дагестан в раннем средневековье (по материалам археологических раскопок Аварии). Махачкала, 1963, In Russian).
 Tahnaeva P.I. Christian culture of Medieval Avaria (7th-16th cc.) in context of reconstruction of the political history. Makhachkala, 2004 (Тахнаева П.И. Христианская культура средневековой Аварии (VII–XVI вв.) в контексте реконструкции политической истории. Махачкала, 2004, In Russian)

History of Dagestan
Former monarchies of Europe
States and territories established in the 5th century